Xenoses is a genus of moths in the family Sesiidae.

Species
Xenoses macropus Durrant, 1924

References

Sesiidae